Hart of Dixie is an American comedy-drama television series that aired on The CW from September 26, 2011, to March 27, 2015. The series, created by Leila Gerstein, stars Rachel Bilson as Dr. Zoe Hart, a New Yorker who, after her dreams of becoming a heart surgeon fall apart, accepts an offer to work as a general practitioner in the fictional Gulf Coast town of Bluebell, Alabama.

Hart of Dixie premiered on September 26, 2011. The show was scheduled to move back to Mondays in the fall for its third season, having been paired with Beauty & the Beast. The show's third season premiered on October 7, 2013.

On May 8, 2014, The CW renewed the show for its fourth season. On July 18, 2014, The CW president Mark Pedowitz announced that Hart of Dixie would have ten episodes for its fourth season, which premiered on December 15, 2014. On March 14, 2015, Leila Gerstein revealed that season four of Hart of Dixie would be its last. The CW officially canceled the show on May 7, 2015.

Plot

Season 1
The first season revolves around Zoe Hart adjusting to life in the small town of Bluebell, Alabama, after failing to secure a fellowship in New York because of her poor bedside manner. She has inherited half of the practice from a father she never knew, with whom Zoe's mother had an affair while engaged to the man Zoe knew as her dad. To keep her half of the inherited practice she must bring in 30% of the patients, which she finds difficult as she is at odds with most of the local residents due to her city persona. Zoe also struggles with her growing feelings for local attorney George Tucker, feelings of which his fiancée, Lemon Breeland, is fully aware, leading her to make it her mission to ensure Zoe leaves Bluebell. Other storylines include neighbor Wade's feelings for Zoe, which may or may not be returned; Zoe's friendship with the mayor, Lavon, and his past with Lemon; and Zoe's unresolved issues regarding her family.

Season 2
The season begins with Zoe confused with her feelings for both George and Wade, as she slept with Wade the night of George and Lemon's aborted wedding at the end of season one. She later decides that George is not ready for another relationship yet and decides to see Wade. Lavon's former high school sweetheart Ruby Jeffries (Golden Brooks) returns to Bluebell and reveals she is opposing him for mayor. George begins dating again, first seeing newcomer Shelby Sinclair; however, he later dumps her, and Shelby begins dating Brick Breeland. George later starts a relationship with Wade's ex-wife, Tansy Truitt. As the season progresses, Ruby leaves after Lemon's jealousy destroys her and Lavon. Wade and Zoe continue to date, though they face their share of setbacks. At the end of the season, Zoe is faced deciding between a summer in New York working at a hospital at her dream job, only to have Wade confess his feelings for her, and she unable to return them. Meanwhile, Annabeth begins having feelings for Lavon, and later the two sleep together, leaving Lemon devastated by her best friend's betrayal.

Season 3
The season begins with Zoe returning to Bluebell after a summer in NYC, along with her new boyfriend Joel (Josh Cooke). George struggles to rebuild his life following his breakup with Tansy but finds love with Lavon's younger cousin. Lemon finds herself in a scandalous relationship, while Annabeth hopes her relationship with Lavon will grow into something more. Zoe learns more about her family roots in Bluebell, breaks up with Joel, and reunites with Wade.

Season 4
The final season deals with Zoe's pregnancy and her relationship with Wade. George, Lemon, Lavon, and Annabeth enter a tumultuous love affair, while Brick has to deal with his past in order to move forward as Lemon and Magnolia meet their half-sister from their estranged mother who left the family. In the end, George and Annabeth move in together, George changes careers to become a music manager, Zoe and Wade get married, and Lemon and Lavon get married. Zoe and Wade's marry in a rushed ceremony, due to Zoe's inhibitions about marriage and having gone into labor. They recite their vows while rushing towards the delivery room, delivering a baby boy.

The final scene shows the town in harmony in the town square, Wade and Zoe with their son. An old love triangle is re-fueled among three elderly members of the community. Zoe asks if all small towns are like Bluebell, to which Wade answers that they probably are not. Zoe agrees, and they get up to walk their son and join their friends.

Cast and characters

•	Rachel Bilson as Zoe Hart, a medical doctor. Graduated from the prestigious medical school of Johns Hopkins University, Zoe is a smart and talented surgeon in her late twenties who aspires to specialize in cardio-thoracic surgery like her famous and successful adopted father. Unfortunately, after four years of residency at a New York hospital, she is denied the postdoctoral fellowship she wanted on the grounds that she needs to gain more experience in managing her relationships with patients. At the same time, the man she had been seeing for six years leaves her overnight, reproaching her for investing more in her medical career than in their relationship. This leads her to move from uptown Manhattan to Bluebell, Alabama, where a well-respected general practitioner has left her his part of a medical practice.

At first, Zoe thought she'd have a quiet year in the small town before returning to her daily life in New York, but she soon realizes that things will not be so easy. As a beautiful, wealthy, glamorous and elegant city girl, she is more accustomed to the trendy restaurants and clubs, fine wines, luxurious fashion boutiques and cobblestone pavements of the big city than to the country bars, beer, fishing shops and dirt roads of the South. She also soon discovers that the kindly doctor from whom she inherited half of the Bluebell medical practice was in fact her biological father. She has a hard time dealing with this news, especially when the man who raised her starts avoiding her phone calls when she attempts to contact him and rekindle their old relationship. Zoe will suffer greatly from the situation throughout the TV series but will keep her courage and stay in Bluebell, determined to achieve the goals she has set for herself.

Over time, viewers discover that despite the distance she tries so hard to put between herself and her patients, the young doctor really does care about them and is willing to do anything - including putting her reputation at risk - to help them. Open-minded and understanding, she never judges them and knows how to question herself when necessary. She goes on to become an invested resident of the town by helping it through its many crises or actively participating in its folklore and gains loyal and sincere friends such as Mayor Lavon Hayes, George Tucker, Annabeth Thibodaux, and many others.

In season 2, she begins a romance with her childish neighbor Wade Kinsella... However, he ends up cheating on her she ends their affair. In the season finale, Zoe sleeps with Wade again and decides to move back to New York City to get some perspective on her life. At the beginning of season 3, six months have passed when Zoe moves back to Bluebell with a new boyfriend, Joel, a writer. Throughout season 3, she continues her romance with him until one of his books is adapted into a film and this forces him to move to Los Angeles. In the season finale, Zoe realizes that she is still in love with Wade Kinsella - who no longer trusts her - and declares that she will do everything she can to win him back. In the first episode of season 4, she tries again to prove to him that they should be together and seduces him, leading them to have sex together once more. Their lovemaking results in a surprise pregnancy. They eventually pick up their romance where it left off two years earlier and marry in the final episode of the series as Zoe gives birth to their child, a baby boy.

•	Scott Porter as George Tucker, a local lawyer in Bluebell. When the events of the series begin, George, 29 years old, is a lawyer practicing in the town of Bluebell and is engaged to his high school sweetheart Lemon Breeland. In the past, he lived in New York City where he worked as a corporate lawyer for the prestigious law firm Cravath, Swaine and Moore, but after two years there, he moved back to Bluebell, homesick for his hometown and his loved ones. Helpful, kind, caring, well-mannered, sincere, intelligent, cute and charming, George is well respected and appreciated by the Bluebell community. He is also Wade Kinsella's best friend since childhood. At the end of season one, he leaves Lemon at the altar after learning of her affair with Mayor Lavon Hayes but also after becoming aware of his own romantic feelings for Zoe Hart. The pretty doctor, however, rejects him and George begins to date other women romantically. In season 2, he starts a romance with Wade's ex-wife, Tansy Truitt. Later, in season 3, he has a brief romance with Lavon's cousin Lynly Hayes. Meanwhile, while still working as a lawyer, George briefly partners with his ex-fiancée, Lemon, in the management of a restaurant, Fancie's, but eventually withdraws from the business when it burns down, leaving the young woman as sole owner and manager from that point on. Throughout the series, once their rivalry is finally buried, he also develops a close friendship with Lavon Hayes, the town's mayor. Although he is one of the few lawyers in Bluebell, George seems to have a lot of free time to pursue other activities such as singing in Lily Anne Lonergan's country band and touring for a summer, co-managing a restaurant, making a commercial to promote the town's strawberries, running races, supervising Boy Scout activities, and managing the artistic careers of the Truitt brothers and Meatball. Since his break-up with Lemon, he has been living on a houseboat owned by Annabeth Thibodaux, with whom he forms a couple in season 4 and remains at the end of the series. George has wealthy parents who tend to meddle in his life when they come to visit him from time to time. He also has a brother, Harry, who is a successful lawyer, senior partner in his family's successful law firm and a candidate for the Senate. He is married and has a daughter, Lily Louise Tucker.

•	Jaime King as Lemon Breeland, the elder daughter of town physician, Bertram Breeland or "Brick". At the beginning of the series, Lemon is the proud, conservative, despotic, fussy and somewhat uptight young president of the Bluebell Belles Association, which she runs with the help of her two best childhood friends, Annabeth Thibodaux (Nass) and Crickett Watts. She is very involved in the daily life of her town, singing and dancing in shows organised as part of municipal projects or helping the town hall to preserve its historical heritage. Aged 29 years old, she has a university degree but has never had a proper paid job and still lives with her father. She is engaged to George Tucker, whom she has been dating for fifteen years, and is planning the wedding of the century. Behind this idyllic picture, however, we discover that she had a brief romantic affair with the mayor, Lavon Hayes, while her fiancé was working in New York and developed deep, strong feelings for him that she now struggles to bury. When Lemon first meets Zoe, her enmity for her is instantaneous. Not only do the two young women have different ways of thinking, but Lemon is under the illusion that the pretty surgeon is trying to interfere with her "perfect" life, and they often end up fighting. In seasons 2 to 4, although she is reluctant to admit it to anyone, she becomes more cordial with Zoe and the two even become friends by the end of the series. Despite her sometimes despotic and manipulative nature, Lemon has a gentle and charming disposition. Benevolent, she is also capable of sacrificing herself for the sake of the people she loves (as when she gives Annabeth her blessing to date Lavon despite her own deep romantic feelings for him, for example). In season 2, determined to be independent, Lemon first worked briefly as a waitress in a local bar and then managed Lavon's election campaign. Soon after, she founds a catering business with Annabeth before becoming the co-owner and co-manager of the Rammer Jammer bar with her long-time friend, Wade Kinsella. She then buys Fancie's, the best restaurant in town, and takes over its management, leaving the Rammer Jammer to her ex-business partner. Lemon has a reputation for being tenacious and somewhat scheming when it comes to getting what she wants. She is a determined woman who will do anything to achieve her goals. After the annulment of her marriage to George, she finds herself with no real profession and no place to live. In order to leave her father's house, she agrees to live on AnnaBeth's barge but discovers that she suffers from seasickness. So she swaps her new home for the flat of her ex-fiancé, George, who then moves onto the boat. Throughout the series, Lemon struggles with the pain she has felt since her mother, Alice, abandoned her and her sister Magnolia twelve years before the events of season 1, when Magnolia - whom Lemon raised as her own daughter - was only two years old. However, in season 4, she finally confronts her mother. She remains hostile towards Alice, whose betrayal she cannot forgive, but eventually accepts that she has a maternal little half-sister, Scarlett Kincaid, and makes extra efforts to get to know her. In the series finale, Lemon finally marries her one true love, Lavon Hayes, and becomes a successful businesswoman.

•	Cress Williams as Lavon Hayes, Mayor and Co-Chair of the Tourism Council of Bluebell. Before becoming the Mayor of Bluebell and Co-Chair of the Tourism Council of the city, Lavon Hayes was a famous NFL linebacker playing professionally for which he won two Super Bowls and was selected for four Pro Bowls. Prior to his professional sports career, he also played for the football team of the University of Alabama from which he graduated. After retiring and returning to Bluebell, he moved into a large colonial house on a beautiful, huge plantation and adopted a pet alligator, which he named Burt Reynolds. Lavon, 33 years old, is a charismatic politician who is very attached and devoted to his town and its citizens, a caring and friendly person, a loyal friend and an open-minded and enlightened man who is somewhat shy with the women he is attracted to, but also a person of positive and enthusiastic nature. It is revealed in season 1 that he had a secret romance with Lemon Breeland while she was still engaged to the Bluebell's lawyer, her long-time boyfriend, George Tucker, when he was living in New York. He was really in love with her at the time, but she ended up pushing him away when her fiancé returned to Bluebell, breaking his heart in the process. Throughout the series, Lavon also builds a great friendship with Zoe Hart and often gives her sound advice on how to better adapt to the city's ways. At the beginning of the first season, he even offers to let her live in the shed on his estate next to the gatehouse where he allows his friend, Wade Kinsella, to reside. Over the course of the series, he has various romantic relationships: first with Didi Ruano, then with his old high school sweetheart, Ruby Jeffries, and finally with Annabeth Thibodaux, Lemon's best friend since childhood. However, during each of these romances, he remains deeply attached to Lemon. After a while, Lavon also befriends George Tucker, although the relationship is sometimes strained by his feelings for George's former fiancée, Lemon. The young mayor is a great fan of television personality Don Todd, and even gets to know him and befriend him, a relationship that later comes in handy in his negotiations with his rival, Fillmore Mayor Todd Gainey Sr. In the series finale, Lavon and Lemon finally marry each other.    

•	Wilson Bethel as Wade Kinsella, a bartender and Zoe's childish neighbor. Wade, in his late twenties, has an eccentric personality. At the beginning of the series, he appears to be an immature, unambitious, womanizing, sarcastic bartender who cares for no one but himself. But we gradually discover that he deeply loves the people around him (though he always tries to hide his true feelings), especially his best friends -George Tucker, Lavon Hayes, Zoe Hart and Lemon Breeland- and his father, Earl Kinsella, the village drunkard to whom he often gives money for food and clothing, and that he is a generous man with a heart of gold. He falls deeply in love with Zoe and tries to change his lifestyle and develop higher ambitions for her. For most of season 2, he is in a monogamous relationship with the young surgeon until she discovers that he has been unfaithful. Wade graduated from Cyrus Lavinius Jeremiah Jones High School, as did George, Annabeth and Lemon, but never went to college after graduation. He is very athletic (he was even on the high school football team) and good at manual labour. He does repairs at Lavon's in exchange for continuing to live in his plantation's gatehouse. He is also a talented musician (he sings, plays guitar and writes and composes songs), a member of a country music band and a gifted cocktail recipe inventor who has always dreamed of owning his own bar. He eventually makes this a reality by becoming co-owner and co-manager of the local bar, the Rammer Jammer, with his longtime friend Lemon Breeland in season two, and then its sole owner and manager in the following season. In the third season, he initially attempts to win back Zoe's love but then begins a serious romantic relationship with Zoe's paternal cousin, Vivian Wilkes, who eventually breaks his heart when she reconciles with her ex-husband and moves with him to Baton Rouge. At the beginning of season 4, Wade has sex with Zoe once again and their lovemaking results in a surprise pregnancy. The two eventually rekindle their romance and marry each other in the final episode of the series as Zoe gives birth to their child, a little Hart-Kinsella boy. Wade has a brother, Jesse Kinsella, an attractive eco-geologist oceanographer and US Army veteran with whom he has a conflicting relationship.

•	Tim Matheson as Bertram Breeland (also named Brick): the Bluebell's local medical practitioner. At the beginning of the series, Brick discovers that he is going to have to share the town's general practice with Zoe Hart, which annoys him greatly. Indeed, he was looking forward to having the clinic to himself after so many years of working in partnership with Harley Wilkes and her arrival ruins his plan. He then makes Zoe's first few weeks in Bluebell extremely difficult and constantly gets in her way, hatching plans to steal her shares of the business and openly criticizing her medical diagnoses and inexperience with Southern hospitality as much as he can. Both determined to win the game, they often clash but, over time, end up developing a sort of "father-daughter" relationship. In fact, despite his rugged and savage appearance, Brick is a caring man entirely devoted to his patients and their welfare, highly respected and appreciated by the Bluebell community in which he has many friends. He is also the father of two daughters: Lemon and Magnolia. Their mother, Alice - his ex-wife - left them twelve years before the events of season 1 to pursue an acting career and never contacted them again. After she left, Lemon -who was only 17 at the time- took care of him and their house and raised her 2-year-old sister as her own daughter. Brick, on the other hand, was very depressed, never able to move on and has been living in the past ever since, unable to invest in a relationship with anyone again. Encouraged by Lemon, he eventually has a brief affair with Emily Chase in season 1, and then in season 2 meets Shelby Sinclair, an exuberant local personality much younger than himself, and falls under her spell. At first, their vast age difference causes Brick a problem, so he quickly decides to break up with her, fearing the opinion of the townspeople about their romance. However, he later realises that he really loves Shelby and tries to win her back. An "on and off" romantic relationship then begins between them. In season 3, Shelby becomes pregnant with the baby daughter of a married man, Alex Byrd, Lieutenant Governor of Alabama. At first, she tries to raise the child, named Ethel, with her father, but soon afterwards dumps him and moves back in with Brick, reviving their romance. One of Brick's main goals is to be voted Man of the Year (MOTY) by the local Fraternal Order of Owl, an honour given to outstanding male figures in the town. The GP is also known for winning the town's annual gumbo contest on several occasions.

•	Kaitlyn Black as Annabeth Thibodaux (or Annabeth Nass as a married woman); a member of the Belles association and Lemon Breeland's and Crickett Watts's best friend. She is sometimes referred to as "A.B.", short for her first name. Annabeth, in her late twenties, is a pretty, strong, cheerful, creative, insightful and empathetic young woman. She graduated from Auburn University where she was a member of the cheerleading squad and where her family is considered a kind of "Royalty". At the beginning of the series, she is an housewife very involved in Bluebell's life, an active member of the Belles who eventually takes over the Memory Matrons, a well-known society dedicated to preserving the town's history. At the time, she was eager to conceive a child with her husband, Jake Nass, but he left her overnight for a Baton Rouge waitress at the end of season 1. Annabeth also maintains a blog -Annabeth's Blog- which can be found on the official Bluebell website. As well as being a good singer and dancer, the young woman is very gifted in cooking and then, in season 2, starts a catering business with her best friend, Lemon Breeland. She then develops romantic feelings for the mayor, Lavon Hayes, but initially decides not to pursue the relationship between them because of Lemon's love for him. However, her best friend gives them her blessing and Annabeth and Lavon can finally begin their romance. Throughout the series, Annabeth also proves to be a close friend of Zoe Hart. In season 3, she becomes the new president of the Belles. She is then employed by Bertram "Brick" Breeland as a medical secretary in his practice and this job leads her to develop an interest in the health field and enrol in nursing school in season 4. Meanwhile, after her break-up with the mayor, she briefly dates the nephew of the rival town's mayor, Davis Polk, who proposes to her. She refuses the proposal, however, confessing to Lemon that she is still in love with Lavon. In season 4, Annabeth realises that she no longer loves Lavon and begins a romance with George Tucker, with whom she is still in a relationship at the end of the series.

Development and production
On February 1, 2011, it was announced that The CW had ordered a pilot for Hart of Dixie. On May 17, 2011, the network officially picked up Hart of Dixie to series, set to air in fall 2011. The series marks the second time executive producer Josh Schwartz and series star Rachel Bilson have worked together on television. The first time the duo worked together was on the Fox teen drama The O.C., created by Schwartz. The show's executive producer, Josh Schwartz, compared the show to Felicity, Everwood, and Gilmore Girls.

With the reveal of The CW's fall 2011 schedule, it was announced that Hart of Dixie would air on Monday at 9:00 pm Eastern/8:00 pm Central, following Gossip Girl. It premiered on Monday, September 26, 2011. On October 12, 2011, the series was picked up for a full season, which will consist of twenty-two episodes. Along with pick-up for all other CW dramas, Mark Pedowitz said "We believe in the creative strength of these dramas, and by giving them back nine orders we can give our audience the chance to enjoy complete seasons of all three of them." On May 11, 2012, The CW renewed the show for a second season, which premiered on October 2, 2012. The CW renewed the show for a third season on April 26, 2013.

Casting
On February 8, 2011, TVLine reported that Rachel Bilson was nearing a deal to star in the series. Her role was later confirmed by The CW in a press release. Soon after, Wilson Bethel joined the cast as Wade Kinsella, Zoe's "gorgeous bad-boy" neighbor. Scott Porter was cast as good-looking lawyer George Tucker, a potential love-interest for Bilson's character.

On May 20, 2011, it was announced that Nancy Travis would not continue with the series due to her commitments with the 20th Century Fox-produced sitcom Last Man Standing. Travis was written out after the first two episodes. Meredith Monroe appeared in one episode as Lemon's estranged mother. JoBeth Williams appeared in three episodes as Candice Hart, the mother of Bilson's character. On July 26, 2013, it was announced that Kaitlyn Black was upgraded to series regular status for season three.

Reception

Critical response
Hart of Dixie first season received mixed reviews, scoring a 43 out of 100 on the review aggregator Metacritic.

TVGuide.com described the show as "Southern Exposure" and, in a later review, stated that the actors are better than the "cutesy" material, although Bilson is not convincing as a heart surgeon. Both TVGuide.com and Robert Bianco of USA Today stated that the show is potentially offensive to the South. Bianco also wrote that the show is shallow and far-fetched, with Bilson giving an unconvincing performance, such as acting surprised when calling herself a doctor. Tim Goodman of The Hollywood Reporter stated that the series is predictable and superficial, but "surprisingly touching".

Writing for The New York Times, critic Neil Genzlinger wrote "the premiere, at least, doesn’t find a convincing way to balance the clashing strands: the city-mouse disorientation, the medical emergencies, the girlfights, the daddy issues, the young-pretty-and-available stuff." Los Angeles Times reviewer Mary McNamara described the show as "a stack of familiar scenarios stitched together to form a pretty if not terribly substantial quilt." TVLine described the show as "Everwood-esque". TVLine later stated: "Beautifully filmed with warm, cozy tones, the Southern setting utterly envelops the glowing Bilson", adding that Porter's appearance "wins us over and makes you forget that clunky intro" and despite the "rom-coms clichés, the pilot is super-efficient at introducing us to those who will be the key players in Zoe’s story, laying the framework for storytelling places to go." Tv Times magazine gave Hart of Dixie its lowest score of 2011–2012: 12 out of 100.

Ratings

Awards and accolades

International broadcasts

References

External links
 
 

2011 American television series debuts
2015 American television series endings
2010s American comedy-drama television series
2010s American LGBT-related comedy television series
2010s American LGBT-related drama television series
2010s American medical television series
The CW original programming
English-language television shows
Lesbian-related television shows
Television shows filmed in North Carolina
Television shows set in Alabama
Television shows set in New York City
Television series by CBS Studios
Television series by Warner Bros. Television Studios